Franchel Ibara (born 27 July 1989) is a Congolese former professional footballer who played as a striker.

Club career
Ibara was born in Brazzaville, Congo. He played for Étoile du Congo before moving to FC Sochaux. After one year in France, he returned to Étoile du Congo and played there until 2010. In November 2010 he signed for DR Congo side AS Vita Club, before returning to Congo a year later. He signed for AC Léopards on November 2011.

International career
Ibara received first cap for the full Congo national team in a qualifying match for the 2010 FIFA World Cup against Chad on 22 June 2008, and he scored his first goal in the match.

He also appeared at the 2007 FIFA U-20 World Cup in Canada, scoring a goal from a penalty in the 59th minute of a match against Austria on 2 July.

Personal life
Franchel's brother Guillaume Ibara played most of his career in the Lower leagues in Belgium. Guillaume played during his time for Belgian provincial football league team Entente Blegnytoise, international games for the Congo national team in the African Nations Cup Qualifier.

References

1989 births
Living people
Sportspeople from Brazzaville
Republic of the Congo footballers
Republic of the Congo international footballers
Association football forwards
FC Sochaux-Montbéliard players
Expatriate footballers in France
Expatriate footballers in the Democratic Republic of the Congo
Republic of the Congo expatriate sportspeople in France
Republic of the Congo expatriate sportspeople in the Democratic Republic of the Congo